Paul Albert Steck (27 May 1866 – 8 July 1924) was a French painter of landscapes, historical scenes, and several portraits from life.

Paul Albert Steck was born in Troyes, France. He began his career studying under Jean-Léon Gérôme. In 1896 he was made a member of the Société des Artistes Français. He also exhibited works in the fifth Salon de la Rose-Croix. In 1900, he won a bronze medal at the Exposition Universelle. Museums in Dieppe, Montauban, and Rouen display his work. He died in Paris.

Selected works

Notes

1924 deaths
19th-century French painters
20th-century French painters
20th-century French male artists
French male painters
1866 births
19th-century French male artists